Wesleyan theology, otherwise known as Wesleyan–Arminian theology, or Methodist theology, is a theological tradition in Protestant Christianity based upon the ministry of the 18th-century evangelical reformer brothers John Wesley and Charles Wesley. More broadly it refers to the theological system inferred from the various sermons (e.g. the Forty-four Sermons), theological treatises, letters, journals, diaries, hymns, and other spiritual writings of the Wesleys and their contemporary coadjutors such as John William Fletcher.

In 1736, the Wesley brothers travelled to the Georgia colony in America as Christian missionaries; they left rather disheartened at what they saw. Both of them subsequently had "religious experiences", especially John in 1738, being greatly influenced by the Moravian Christians. They began to organize a renewal movement within the Church of England to focus on personal faith and holiness. John Wesley took Protestant churches to task over the nature of sanctification, the process by which a believer is conformed to the image of Christ, emphasizing New Testament teachings regarding the work of God and the believer in sanctification.

Wesleyan–Arminian theology, manifest today in Methodism (inclusive of the Holiness movement), is named after its founders, John Wesley in particular, as well as for Jacobus Arminius, since it is a subset of Arminian theology. The Wesleys were clergymen in the Church of England, though the Wesleyan tradition places stronger emphasis on extemporaneous preaching, evangelism, as well as personal faith and personal experience, especially on the new birth, assurance, growth in grace, entire sanctification and outward holiness. In his Sunday Service John Wesley included the Articles of Religion, which were based on the Thirty-nine Articles of the Church of England, though stripped of their more peculiarly Calvinistic theological leanings. Wesleyan theology asserts the primary authority of Scripture and affirms the Christological orthodoxy of the first five centuries of church history.

Background 

Wesleyan–Arminianism developed as an attempt to explain Christianity in a manner unlike the teachings of Calvinism. Arminianism is a theological study conducted by Jacobus Arminius, from the Netherlands, in opposition to Calvinist orthodoxy on the basis of free will. In 1610, after the death of Arminius his followers, the Remonstrants led by Simon Episcopius, presented a document to the Netherlands. This document is known today as the Five Articles of Remonstrance. Wesleyan theology, on the other hand, was founded upon the teachings of John Wesley, an English evangelist, and the beliefs of this dogma are derived from his many publications, including his collected sermons, journal, abridgements of theological, devotional, and historical Christian works, and a variety of tracts and treatises on theological subjects. Subsequently, the two theories have joined into one set of values for the contemporary church; yet, when examined separately, their unique details can be discovered, as well as their similarities in ideals.

In the early 1770s, John Wesley, aided by the theological writings of John William Fletcher, emphasized Arminian doctrines in his controversy with the Calvinistic wing of the evangelicals in England. Then, in 1778, he founded a theological journal which he titled the Arminian Magazine. This period, during the Calvinist–Arminian debate, was influential in forming a lasting link between Arminian and Wesleyan theology.

Wesley's opposition to Calvinism was more successful than Arminius's, especially in the United States where Arminianism would become the dominant school of soteriology of Evangelical Protestantism, largely because it was spread through popular preaching in a series of Great Awakenings. Arminius's work was not a direct influence on Wesley. Yet, he chose the term "Arminianism" to distinguish the kind of Evangelicalism his followers were to espouse from that of their Calvinist theological opponents. Many have considered the most accurate term for Wesleyan theology to be "Evangelical Arminianism."

Wesley is remembered for visiting the Moravians of both Georgia and Germany and examining their beliefs, then founding the Methodist movement, the precursor to the later variety of Methodist denominations. Wesley's desire was not to form a new sect, but rather to reform the nation and "spread scriptural holiness" as truth. However, the creation of Wesleyan–Arminianism has today developed into a popular standard for many contemporary churches. 

Although its primary legacy remains within the various Methodist denominations (see ), the Wesleyan tradition has been refined and reinterpreted as catalyst for other distinct denominations as well, e.g., Phoebe Palmer and the Holiness movement (which includes Methodism, but spread to other traditions too); Phineas F. Bresee and the Church of the Nazarene; and William J. Seymour and the Wesleyan holiness wing of the Pentecostal movement represented by denominations such as the International Pentecostal Holiness Church.

Wesleyan distinctives

Definition of sin 

Methodist theology teaches:

Firstly, it categorizes sin as being original sin and actual sin:
 Wesleyans have a distinct understanding of the nature of actual sin, which is divided into the categories of "sin proper" and "sin improper". As explained by John Wesley, "Nothing is sin, strictly speaking, but a voluntary transgression of a known law of God. Therefore, every voluntary breach of the law of love is sin; and nothing else, if we speak properly. To strain the matter farther is only to make way for Calvinism." With this narrower understanding of sin, John Wesley believed that it was not only possible but necessary to live without committing sin. Wesley explains this in his comments on  "Whosoever abideth in communion with him—By loving faith, sinneth not—While he so abideth. Whosoever sinneth certainly seeth him not—The loving eye of his soul is not then fixed upon God; neither doth he then experimentally know him—Whatever he did in time past."

Salvation

Atonement

Wesleyan–Arminian theology falls squarely in the tradition of substitutionary atonement, though it is linked with Christus Victor and moral influence theories. In elucidating , John Wesley says that Christ manifesting himself in the hearts of humans destroys the work of Satan, thus making Christus Victor imagery "one part of the framework of substitutionary atonement." The Methodist divine Charles Wesley's hymns "Sinners, Turn, Why Will You Die" and "And Can It be That I Should Gain" concurrently demonstrate that Christ's sacrifice is the example of supreme love, while also convicting the Christian believer of his/her sins, thus using the moral influence theory within the structure of penal substitution in accordance with the Augustinian theology of illumination. Wesleyan theology also emphasizes a participatory nature in atonement, in which the Methodist believer spiritually dies with Christ and Christ dies for humanity; this is reflected in the words of the following Methodist hymn (122):

The Christian believer mystically draws themselves into the scene of the crucifixion in order to experience the power of salvation that it possesses. In the Lord's Supper, the Methodist especially experiences the participatory nature of substitutionary atonement as "the sacrament sets before our eyes Christ's death and suffering whereby we are transported into an experience of the crucifixion."

With regard to the fate of the unlearned, Willard Francis Mallalieu, a Methodist bishop, wrote in Some Things That Methodism Stands For:

Justification and sanctification

In Methodism, the way of salvation includes conviction, repentance, restitution, faith, justification, regeneration and adoption, which is followed by sanctification and witness of the Spirit. Being convicted of sin and the need for a saviour, as well as repenting of sin and making restitution, is "essential preparation for saving faith". Wesleyan theology teaches that the new birth contains two phases that occur together, justification and regeneration:

At the moment a person experiences the New Birth, he/she is "adopted into the family of God". The Wesleyan tradition seeks to establish justification by faith as the gateway to sanctification or "scriptural holiness." Wesleyans teach that God provides grace that enables any person to freely choose to place faith in Christ or reject his salvation (see synergism). If the person accepts it, then God justifies them and continues to give further grace to spiritually heal and sanctify them. In Wesleyan theology, justification specifically refers to "pardon, the forgiveness of sins", rather than "being made actually just and righteous", which Wesleyans believe is accomplished through sanctification, that is, the pursuit of holiness in salvation. John Wesley taught that the keeping of the moral law contained in the Ten Commandments, as well as engaging in the works of piety and the works of mercy, were "indispensable for our sanctification".

Wesley insisted that imputed righteousness must become imparted righteousness. He taught that a believer could progress in love until love became devoid of self-interest at the moment of entire sanctification. Wesleyan theology teaches that there are two distinct phases in the Christian experience. In the first work of grace (the new birth) a person repents of his/her sin that he/she confesses to God, places his/her faith in Jesus, receives forgiveness and becomes a Christian; during the second work of grace, entire sanctification, the believer is purified and made holy.

Wesleyan Methodism, inclusive of the holiness movement, thus teaches that restitution occurs subsequent to repentance. Additionally, "justification [is made] conditional on obedience and progress in sanctification" emphasizing "a deep reliance upon Christ not only in coming to faith, but in remaining in the faith." Bishop Scott J. Jones states that "United Methodist doctrine thus understands true, saving faith to be the kind that, give time and opportunity, will result in good works. Any supposed faith that does not in fact lead to such behaviors is not genuine, saving faith." For Methodists, "true faith...cannot subsist without works". (See .) Methodist evangelist Phoebe Palmer stated that "justification would have ended with me had I refused to be holy." While "faith is essential for a meaningful relationship with God, our relationship with God also takes shape through our care for people, the community, and creation itself."

First work of grace: new birth

John Wesley held that the new birth "is that great change which God works in the soul when he brings it into life, when he raises it from the death of sin to the life of righteousness" (Works, vol. 2, pp. 193–194). In the life of a Christian, the new birth is considered the first work of grace. The Articles of Religion, in Article XVII—Of Baptism, state that baptism is a "sign of regeneration or the new birth." (See .) The Methodist Visitor in describing this doctrine, admonishes individuals: "'Ye must be born again.' Yield to God that He may perform this work in and for you. Admit Him to your heart. 'Believe on the Lord Jesus Christ, and thou shalt be saved.'"

After the New Birth, if a person commits sin, he/she may be restored to fellowship with God through sincere repentance and then "by the grace of God, rise[s] again and amend[s]" his/her life.

Second work of grace: Christian perfection

Methodists, following in John Wesley's footsteps, believe in the second work of grace— enabling entire sanctification, also called Christian perfection—which removes original sin and makes the believer holy (cf. baptism with the Holy Spirit); Wesley explained: "Entire sanctification, or Christian perfection, is neither more nor less than pure love; love expelling sin, and governing both the heart and life of a child of God. The Refiner's fire purges out all that is contrary to love." Wesley taught both that sanctification could be an instantaneous experience, and that it could be a gradual process. Before a believer is entirely sanctified, he/she consecrates himself/herself to God; the theology behind consecration is summarized with the maxim "Give yourself to God in all things, if you would have God give Himself to you."

The Methodist Churches teach that apostasy can occur through a loss of faith or through sinning (refusing to be holy). If a person backslides but later decides to return to God, he or she must confess his or her sins and be entirely sanctified again (see conditional security).

Richard P. Bucher, contrasts this position with the Lutheran one, discussing an analogy put forth by Wesley:

Assurance of faith

John Wesley believed that all Christians have a faith which implies an "assurance" of God's forgiving love, and that one would feel that assurance, or the "witness of the Spirit". This understanding is grounded in Paul's affirmation, "...ye have received the Spirit of adoption, whereby we cry Abba, Father. The same Spirit beareth witness with our spirits, that we are the children of God..." (Wesley's translation). This experience was mirrored for Wesley in his Aldersgate experience wherein he "knew" he was loved by God and that his sins were forgiven.

"I felt my heart strangely warmed. I felt I did trust in Christ, Christ alone for salvation, and an assurance was given me that He had taken my sin, even mine." — from Wesley's Journal

Conditional security

John Wesley was an outspoken defender of the doctrine of conditional preservation of the saints, or commonly "conditional security". In 1751, Wesley defended his position in a work titled, "Serious Thoughts Upon the Perseverance of the Saints." In it he argued that a believer remains in a saving relationship with God if he "continue in faith" or "endureth in faith unto the end." Wesley affirmed that a child of God, "while he continues a true believer, cannot go to hell." However, if he makes a "shipwreck of the faith, then a man that believes now may be an unbeliever some time hence" and become "a child of the devil." He then adds, "God is the Father of them that believe, so long as they believe. But the devil is the father of them that believe not, whether they did once believe or no."

Like his Arminian predecessors, Wesley was convinced from the testimony of the Scriptures that a true believer may abandon faith and the way of righteousness and "fall from God as to perish everlastingly."

Covenant theology

Methodism maintains the superstructure of classical covenant theology, but being Arminian in soteriology, it discards the "predestinarian template of Reformed theology that was part and parcel of its historical development." The main difference between Wesleyan covenant theology and classical covenant theology is as follows:

As such, in the traditional Wesleyan view, only Adam and Eve were under the covenant of works, while on the other hand, all of their progeny are under the covenant of grace. With Mosaic Law belonging to the covenant of grace, all of humanity is brought "within the reach of the provisions of that covenant." This belief is reflected in John Wesley's sermon Righteousness of Faith: "The Apostle does not here oppose the covenant given by Moses, to the covenant given by Christ. ... But it is the covenant of grace, which God, through Christ, hath established with men in all ages". The covenant of grace was therefore administered through "promises, prophecies, sacrifices, and at last by circumcision" during the patriarchal ages and through "the paschal lamb, the scape goat, [and] the priesthood of Aaron" under Mosaic Law. Under the Gospel, the covenant of grace is mediated through the greater sacraments, baptism and the Lord's Supper.

Ecclesiology

Methodists affirm belief in "the one true Church, Apostolic and Universal", viewing their Churches as constituting a "privileged branch of this true church". With regard to the position of Methodism within Christendom, the founder of the movement "John Wesley once noted that what God had achieved in the development of Methodism was no mere human endeavor but the work of God. As such it would be preserved by God so long as history remained." Calling it "the grand depositum" of the Methodist faith, Wesley specifically taught that the propagation of the doctrine of entire sanctification was the reason that God raised up the Methodists in the world.

Free will
Methodist theology teaches the doctrine of free will:

Four sources of theological authority

The 20th-century Wesley scholar Albert Outler argued in his introduction to the 1964 collection John Wesley that Wesley developed his theology by using a method that Outler termed the Wesleyan Quadrilateral. The Free Methodist Church teaches:

Likewise, the Methodist Church of Great Britain refers to the quadrilateral as "a fourfold approach" to learning and applying the Christian faith, and the United Methodist Church asserts that:

Four Last Things

With respect to the four last things, Wesleyan theology affirms the belief in Hades, "the intermediate state of souls between death and the general resurrection," which is divided into Paradise (for the righteous) and Gehenna (for the wicked). After the general judgment, Hades will be abolished. John Wesley "made a distinction between hell (the receptacle of the damned) and Hades (the receptacle of all separate spirits), and also between paradise (the antechamber of heaven) and heaven itself." The dead will remain in Hades "until the Day of Judgment when we will all be bodily resurrected and stand before Christ as our judge. After the Judgment, the Righteous will go to their eternal reward in Heaven and the Accursed will depart to Hell (see )." 

Wesley stated that: "I believe it to be a duty to observe, to pray for the Faithful Departed". He "taught the propriety of Praying for the Dead, practised it himself, provided Forms that others might." In a joint statement with the Catholic Church in England and Wales, the Methodist Church of Great Britain affirmed that "Methodists who pray for the dead thereby commend them to the continuing mercy of God."

Sacraments and rites

Baptism

The Methodist Articles of Religion, with regard to baptism, teach:

While baptism imparts regenerating grace, its permanence is contingent upon repentance and a personal commitment to Jesus Christ.
Wesleyan theology holds that baptism is a sacrament of initiation into the visible Church. Wesleyan covenant theology further teaches that baptism is a sign and a seal of the covenant of grace:
 
Methodists recognize three modes of baptism as being valid—immersion, aspersion or affusion—in the name of the Holy Trinity.

Real presence of Christ in the Lord's Supper
The followers of John Wesley have typically affirmed that the sacrament of Holy Communion (the Lord's Supper) is an instrumental Means of Grace through which the real presence of Christ is communicated to the believer, but have otherwise allowed the details to remain a mystery. In particular, Methodists reject the Catholic doctrine of transubstantiation (see "Article XVIII" of the Articles of Religion); the Primitive Methodist Church, in its Discipline also rejects the Lollardist doctrine of consubstantiation. In 2004, the United Methodist Church affirmed its view of the sacrament and its belief in the real presence in an official document entitled This Holy Mystery: A United Methodist Understanding of Holy Communion. Of particular note here is the church's unequivocal recognition of the anamnesis as more than just a memorial but, rather, a re-presentation of Christ Jesus and his love.

Holy Communion is remembrance, commemoration, and memorial, but this remembrance is much more than simply intellectual recalling. "Do this in remembrance of me" (Luke 22:19; 1 Corinthians 11:24–25) is anamnesis (the biblical Greek word). This dynamic action becomes re-presentation of past gracious acts of God in the present, so powerfully as to make them truly present now. Christ is risen and is alive here and now, not just remembered for what was done in the past.

This affirmation of real presence can be seen clearly illustrated in the language of the United Methodist Communion Liturgy where, in the epiclesis of the Great Thanksgiving, the celebrating minister prays over the elements:

Pour out your Holy Spirit on us gathered here, and on these gifts of bread and wine. Make them be for us the body and blood of Christ, that we may be for the world the body of Christ, redeemed by his blood.

Methodists assert that Jesus is truly present, and that the means of his presence is a "Holy Mystery". A celebrating minister will pray for the Holy Spirit to make the elements "be for us the body and blood of Christ", and the congregation can even sing, as in the third stanza of Charles Wesley's hymn Come Sinners to the Gospel Feast:

Come and partake the gospel feast,
be saved from sin, in Jesus rest;
O taste the goodness of our God,
and eat his flesh and drink his blood.

The distinctive feature of the Methodist doctrine of the real presence is that the way Christ manifests his presence in the sacrament is a sacred mystery—the focus is that Christ is truly present in the sacrament. The Discipline of the Free Methodist Church thus teaches:

Confession
Penance, including the practice of confessing sins, is defined by the Articles of Religion as one those "Commonly called Sacraments but not to be counted for Sacraments of the Gospel", also known as the "five lesser sacraments". John Wesley held "the validity of Anglican practice in his day as reflected in the 1662 Book of Common Prayer", stating that "We grant confession to men to be in many cases of use: public, in case of public scandal; private, to a spiritual guide for disburdening of the conscience, and as a help to repentance." Additionally, per the recommendation of Wesley, Methodist class meetings, as well as penitent bands, traditionally met weekly in order to confess sins to one another.

Lovefeast

Lovefeasts (in which bread and the loving-cup is shared between members of the congregation) are a means of grace, a "converting ordinance" that John Wesley believed to be an apostolic institution. One account from July 1776 expounded on the fact that people experienced entire sanctification at a Lovefeast:

Footwashing
In certain Methodist connexions, such as the Missionary Methodist Church and the New Congregational Methodist Church, footwashing is practiced at the time that the Lord's Supper is celebrated. The Missionary Methodist Church states in its Book of Discipline:

In other connexions such as the United Methodist Church, footwashing is practiced especially on Maundy Thursday.

Validity of Holy Orders

John Wesley held that the offices of bishop and presbyter constituted one order, citing an ancient opinion from the Church of Alexandria; Jerome, a Church Father, wrote: "For even at Alexandria from the time of Mark the Evangelist until the episcopates of Heraclas and Dionysius the presbyters always named as bishop one of their own number chosen by themselves and set in a more exalted position, just as an army elects a general, or as deacons appoint one of themselves whom they know to be diligent and call him archdeacon. For what function, excepting ordination, belongs to a bishop that does not also belong to a presbyter?" (Letter CXLVI). John Wesley thus argued that for two centuries the succession of bishops in the Church of Alexandria, which was founded by Mark the Evangelist, was preserved through ordination by presbyters alone and was considered valid by that ancient Church.

Since the Bishop of London refused to ordain ministers in the British American colonies, this constituted an emergency and as a result, on 2 September 1784, Wesley, along with a priest from the Anglican Church and two other elders, operating under the ancient Alexandrian habitude, ordained Thomas Coke a superintendent, although Coke embraced the title bishop.

Today, the United Methodist Church follows this ancient Alexandrian practice as bishops are elected from the presbyterate: the Discipline of the Methodist Church, in ¶303, affirms that "ordination to this ministry is a gift from God to the Church. In ordination, the Church affirms and continues the apostolic ministry through persons empowered by the Holy Spirit." It also cites Scripture in support of this practice, namely, 1 Timothy 4:14, which states: 
The Methodist Church also buttresses this argument with the leg of sacred tradition of the Wesleyan Quadrilateral by citing the Church Fathers, many of whom concur with this view.

In addition to the aforementioned arguments, in 1937 the annual Conference of the British Methodist Church located the "true continuity" with the Church of past ages in "the continuity of Christian experience, the fellowship in the gift of the one Spirit; in the continuity in the allegiance to one Lord, the continued proclamation of the message; the continued acceptance of the mission;..." [through a long chain which goes back to] "the first disciples in the company of the Lord Himself ... This is our doctrine of apostolic succession" [which neither depends on, nor is secured by,] "an official succession of ministers, whether bishops or presbyters, from apostolic times, but rather by fidelity to apostolic truth".

Canonical hours

Early Methodism was known for its "almost monastic rigors, its living by rule, [and] its canonical hours of prayer". It inherited from its Anglican patrimony the rubrics of reciting the Daily Office, which Methodist Christians were expected to pray. The first prayer book of Methodism, The Sunday Service of the Methodists with other occasional Services thus included the canonical hours of both Morning Prayer and Evening Prayer; these two fixed prayer times were observed everyday in early Christianity, individually on weekdays and corporately on the Lord's Day. Later Methodist liturgical books, such as The Methodist Worship Book (1999) provide for Morning Prayer and Evening Prayer to be prayed daily; the United Methodist Church encourages its communicants to pray the canonical hours as "one of the essential practices" of being a disciple of Jesus. Some Methodist religious orders publish the Daily Office to be used for that community, for example, The Book of Offices and Services of The Order of Saint Luke contains the canonical hours to be prayed traditionally at seven fixed prayer times: Lauds (6 am), Terce (9 am), Sext (12 pm), None (3 pm), Vespers (6 pm), Compline (9 pm) and Vigil (12 am).

Outward holiness

Early Methodists wore plain dress, with Methodist clergy condemning "high headdresses, ruffles, laces, gold, and 'costly apparel' in general". John Wesley recommended that Methodists annually read his thoughts On Dress; in that sermon, John Wesley expressed his desire for Methodists: "Let me see, before I die, a Methodist congregation, full as plain dressed as a Quaker congregation". The 1858 Discipline of the Wesleyan Methodist Connection thus stated that "we would ... enjoin on all who fear God plain dress". Peter Cartwright, a Methodist revivalist, stated that in addition to wearing plain dress, the early Methodists distinguished themselves from other members of society by fasting on Fridays, abstaining from alcohol, and devoutly observing the Sabbath. Methodist circuit riders were known for practicing the spiritual discipline of mortifying the flesh as they "arose well before dawn for solitary prayer; they remained on their knees without food or drink or physical comforts sometimes for hours on end". The early Methodists did not participate in, and condemned, "worldly habits" including "playing cards, racing horses, gambling, attending the theater, dancing (both in frolics and balls), and cockfighting".

Over time, many of these practices were gradually relaxed in mainline Methodism, although practices such as teetotalism and fasting are still very much encouraged, in addition to the current prohibition of gambling; denominations of the conservative holiness movement, such as the Allegheny Wesleyan Methodist Connection and Evangelical Wesleyan Church, continue to reflect the spirit of the historic Methodist practice of wearing plain dress, encouraging members in "abstaining from the wearing of extravagant hairstyles, jewelry—to include rings, and expensive clothing for any reason". The Fellowship of Independent Methodist Churches, which continues to observe the ordinance of women's headcovering, stipulates "renouncing all vain pomp and glory" and "adorning oneself with modest attire." The General Rules of the Methodist Church in America, which are among the doctrinal standards of many Methodist Churches, promote first-day Sabbatarianism as they require "attending upon all the ordinances of God" including "the public worship of God" and prohibit "profaning the day of the Lord, either by doing ordinary work therein or by buying or selling".

Teetotalism

John Wesley "laid foundations for Methodism's traditional call to abstain from beverage alcohol and its warnings about the use of drugs." Wesley referred to liquors as "certain, though slow, poison" and condemned those who sold it of leading people to hell. Methodist Churches are traditionally aligned with the temperance movement and its call for teetotalism. In Great Britain, both Wesleyan Methodists and Primitive Methodists championed the cause of temperance; the Methodist Board of Temperance, Prohibition, and Public Morals was later established in the United States to further the movement. ¶91 of the 2014 Discipline of the Allegheny Wesleyan Methodist Connection summarizes the traditional practice of Methodists regarding their requirement of abstinence from alcohol and other drugs:

Fasting
Fasting is considered one of the works of piety. Methodism's principal liturgical book The Sunday Service of the Methodists (put together by John Wesley), as well as The Directions Given to Band Societies (25 December 1744) by John Wesley, mandate fasting and abstinence from meat on all Fridays of the year (in remembrance of the crucifixion of Jesus).<ref name="Wesley1825">{{cite book |author1=John Wesley |title=The Sunday Service of the Methodists |date=1825 |publisher=J. Kershaw |page=145 |language=English |quote=Days of Fasting or Abstinence All the Fridays in the Year, except Christmas-Day}}</ref> Wesley himself also kept the Eucharistic Fast, thus fasting before receiving Holy Communion "for the purpose of focusing his attention on God," and asked other Methodist Christians to do the same.

Law and Gospel

John Wesley admonished Methodist preachers to emphasize both the Law and the Gospel:

Methodism makes a distinction between the ceremonial law and the moral law that is the Ten Commandments given to Moses. In Methodist Christianity, the moral law is the "fundamental ontological principle of the universe" and "is grounded in eternity", being "engraved on human hearts by the finger of God." In contradistinction to the teaching of the Lutheran Churches, the Methodist Churches bring the Law and the Gospel together in a profound sense: "the law is grace and through it we discover the good news of the way life is intended to be lived." John Wesley, the father of the Methodist tradition taught:

Sunday Sabbatarianism

The early Methodists were known for "religiously keeping the Sabbath day". They regarded "keeping the Lord's Day as a duty, a delight, and a means of grace". The General Rules of the Methodist Church require "attending upon all the ordinances of God" including "the public worship of God" and prohibit "profaning the day of the Lord, either by doing ordinary work therein or by buying or selling". The Sunday Sabbatarian practices of the earlier Wesleyan Methodist Church in Great Britain are described by Jonathan Crowther in A Portraiture of Methodism:

 Churches upholding Wesleyan theology 

Methodism began as a reform movement within the Church of England, and, for a while, it remained as such. The movement separated itself from its "mother church" and became known as the Methodist Episcopal Church in America and the Wesleyan Methodist Church in Britain (as distinguished from Calvinistic Methodism). Many divisions occurred within the Methodist Episcopal Church in the 19th century, mostly over attitudes towards slavery (though doctrinally, opposition to slavery is one of the works of mercy). Some of these schisms healed in the early 20th century, and many of the splinter Methodist groups came together by 1939 to form the Methodist Church. In 1968, the Methodist Church joined with the Radical Pietist Evangelical United Brethren Church to form The United Methodist Church, the largest Methodist church in America. Other groups include the African Methodist Episcopal Church, the African Methodist Episcopal Zion Church, Christian Methodist Episcopal Church, the Congregational Methodist Church, the Evangelical Methodist Church, the Free Methodist Church, the Independent Methodist Churches, the Primitive Methodist Church, and the Southern Methodist Church.

In 19th-century America, a dissension arose over the nature of entire sanctification. Those who believed that entire sanctification could occur both instantaneously or could result from progressive sanctification culminating in Christian perfection, remained within the mainline Methodist Churches; others, however, heavily emphasized the instantaneous nature of entire sanctification. The latter line of thought came to be known as the holiness movement and while many of those who supported it remained in mainline Methodism (e.g. Asbury Theological Seminary), others began the various holiness churches, including the Free Methodist Church, Church of God (Holiness), the Church of God (Anderson), the Churches of Christ in Christian Union, and the Wesleyan Methodist Church, which later merged with the Pilgrim Holiness Church to form the Wesleyan Church, which is present today. Other holiness groups, which also rejected the competing Pentecostal movement, merged to form the Church of the Nazarene. The Salvation Army is another Wesleyan-Holiness group which traces its roots to early Methodism. The Salvation Army's founders Catherine and William Booth founded the organization to stress evangelism and social action when William was a minister in the Methodist Reform Church.

The conservative holiness movement, including denominations such as the Allegheny Wesleyan Methodist Connection, Bible Methodist Connection of Churches, Evangelical Wesleyan Church and Primitive Methodist Church, emerged in the 19th and 20th centuries to herald many of the strict standards of primitive Methodism, including outward holiness, plain dress, and temperance.

 See also 
 Saints in Methodism
 Eucharist § Methodist

 Notes and references 
 Citations 

 Sources 

 
 
 

 Further reading 

 Wallace Thornton, Jr., Radical Righteousness Wallace Thornton, Jr., The Conservative Holiness Movement: A Historical Appraisal Steve Harper, The Way to Heaven: The Gospel According to John Wesley Kenneth J. Collins, Wesley on Salvation Kenneth J. Collins, The Scripture Way of Salvation Harald Lindström, Wesley and Sanctification Thomas C. Oden, John Wesley's Scriptural Christianity Adam Clarke, Clarke's Christian Theology John Wesley, The Works of John Wesley (Baker Books, 2002)
 Huzar, Eleanor, "Arminianism" in the Encyclopedia Americana (Danbury, 1994).
 Outler, Albert C., "John Wesley" in the Encyclopedia Americana'' (Danbury, 1994).

Protestantism in the United States
Christian terminology
History of Methodism
Wesleyan Church
Arminianism